Pine Creek is a 13.8-mile (22.1 km) long tributary to Oil Creek in Crawford County, Pennsylvania. Most of Pine Creek and its tributaries are classed as Exceptional Value (EV) or High-quality-Cold Water Fishery (HQ-CWF).  Only the lowest part of Pine Creek near Oil Creek is classed as a cold-water fishery.

Variant names
According to the Geographic Names Information System, it has also been known historically as:  
East Branch Oil Creek
Pine Run

Course
Pine Creek rises on the Caldwell and Tidioute Creek divide near Excelsior Corners, Pennsylvania in Warren County.  Pine Creek then flows southwest to meet Oil Creek just southeast of Titusville in Crawford County.

Watershed
Pine Creek drains  of area, receives about 44.8 in/year of precipitation, has a topographic wetness index of 426.68, and has an average water temperature of 7.35 °C.  The watershed is 79% forested.

References

External links
 Stream Redesignation Evaluation Report Water Quality Standards Review for Pine Creek

Additional Maps

Rivers of Pennsylvania
Rivers of Crawford County, Pennsylvania
Rivers of Warren County, Pennsylvania